Race horse trainers train horses for horse racing.  This involves exercising, feeding, management and, in early years, to get them used to human contact.

Once a horse is old enough to be ridden, a trainer prepares a horse for races, with responsibility for exercising it, getting it race-ready and determining which races it should enter. Leading horse trainers can earn a great deal of money from a percentage of the winnings that they charge the owner for training the horse. 

Outside horse racing, most trainers specialize in a certain equestrianism discipline. Some fields can be very lucrative, usually depending on the value of the horses one trains or prize money available in competition.

Prominent race horse trainers

United Kingdom & Ireland

 John Gosden
 Tim Easterby
 Michael Stoute
 Henry Cecil
 Mick Channon
 Luca Cumani
 Tim Forster
 Dick Hern
 Mark Johnston
 Henrietta Knight
 Ginger McCain
  Paul Nicholls
 Aidan O'Brien
 Vincent O'Brien
 Martin Pipe
 Mark Prescott
 Fred Rimell
 Ted Walsh
 Fred Winter

United States
 Steve Asmussen
 Bob Baffert
 Matt Baker
 Patrick L. Biancone
 Chad C. Brown
 Christophe Clement
 Brad H. Cox
 Bud Delp
 Michael Dickinson
 Richard E. Dutrow Sr.
 Robert J. Frankel
 H. Allen Jerkens
 D. Wayne Lukas
 Richard Mandella
 Michael R. Matz
 Ron McAnally
 Shug McGaughey
 Kiaran McLaughlin
 H. Graham Motion
 William I. Mott
 Todd Pletcher
 Monty Roberts?
 Art Sherman
 Barclay Tagg
 Stacy Westfall
 Charlie Whittingham
According to The American Racing Manual, the thoroughbred horse racing trainers who have led the annual money-earning list more than twice since 1908 are:
D. Wayne Lukas (14)
Sam Hildreth (9)
Charlie Whittingham (7)
Sunny Jim Fitzsimmons, Horace A. "Jimmy" Jones (5)
Bob Baffert, Laz Barrera, Ben A. Jones, William Molter (4)
Hirsch Jacobs, Edward A. Neloy, James G. Rowe, Sr. (3)

Australia
 Bart Cummings
 Tommy Smith
 Colin Hayes
 Noel Francis Kelly
 Gai Waterhouse
 Lee Freedman
 David A. Hayes
 Chris Waller

India 

 Rashid Byramji 
 Pesi Shroff

New Zealand

Thoroughbred

 Tony Allan
 Murray Baker
 Roger James
 Colin Jillings
 Laurie Laxon
 Sheila Laxon
 Trevor McKee
 Lance O'Sullivan
 Paul O'Sullivan
 Jamie Richards
 Graeme Rogerson

Standardbred

 Cecil Devine
 Tony Herlihy
 Charlie Hunter
 Denis Nyhan
 Mark Purdon
 Natalie Rasmussen
 Steven Reid
 Doody Townley

See also
Horse training
Horse racing

References

Horse racing-related lists